Joe Ferguson is a former American football quarterback in the NFL.

Joe Ferguson may also refer to:
Joe Ferguson (baseball) (born 1946), former Major League Baseball catcher
Joe Ferguson (1962–2001), director of the geography education outreach program for the National Geographic Society
Joe Ferguson, Northern Irish radio presenter on Belfast CityBeat
Joe Ferguson (rugby league), rugby league footballer who played in the 1890s, 1900s, 1910s and 1920s
Joseph Ferguson (MP) (1788–1853), British Whig politician, MP for Carlisle, between 1852–1857
Joseph Ferguson (Australian politician) (died 1912) member for Ovens in the Victorian Legislative Assembly
Joseph Ferguson (coach), former head coach for the Warrensburg Teachers College in basketball and football
Joseph T. Ferguson (1892–1979), Ohio State Auditor
Joe Ferguson (footballer) (born 2002), English-Indonesian association footballer